Trichogramma evanescens is a 0.5mm long parasitoid wasp which parasites Lepidoptera eggs.

Use for biocontrol
In the Philippines this parasitoid has been used to eradicate the Asian Corn Borer, a pest of maize in East Asia. Some companies sell this insect in the pupal stage to be deposited in fields that have Lepidoptera pests.

In 2021 the National Trust in England embarked on a trial of using T. evanescens, which parasitises clothes moth eggs, in conjunction with pheromones to control common clothes moths, which cause serious damage to carpets, furniture, clothing and other wool and silk objects in historic buildings. The trial was abandoned in 2023; while the microwasps performed well at reducing moth populations in combination with pheromones, they were no better than pheromones alone.

References 

Trichogrammatidae
Insects described in 1833